The Teatro Comunale (Communal Theatre) in Ferrara is an opera house, located in the Italian region of Emilia-Romagna, and built between 1786 and 1797 with seating for 990.
Privately owned theatres with limited seating capacity had existed in the city for many years, but the arrival of Cardinal Spinelli, the new papal envoy, in 1786 spurred the  construction of a new public theatre under the architects Cosimo Morelli and Antonio Foschini.  However, their disagreements led to conflicting design concepts regarding the elliptical shape of the auditorium which were resolved through compromise.  The theatre was finally ready for its inaugural presentation of Portogallo's Gli Orazi e i Curiazi on 2 September 1798.

The theatre is noted for staging the premiere of an early opera written by Gioacchino Rossini at the  age of twenty, Ciro in Babilonia in March 1812.

Between 1825 and 1826 some renovation work was required, followed by some more in 1850, creating the theatre as seen today.  In 1928 an orchestra pit was added.  During the Second World War the theatre suffered badly from Allied bombing and, although it opened occasionally in the immediate post-war years, it closed in 1956, not to re-open until further restoration took place in the early 1960s and then once again between 1987 and 1989.

The present-day auditorium has 5 tiers, while the ceiling displays four scenes from the life of Julius Caesar. It now seats 890.

Following the Second World War and subsequent renovations, performances were fairly sporadic, but after the creation of “Ferrara Musica” in 1988, more operatic performances have been staged, some of obscure or little-known operas, and other, more popular works alongside other theatres in the Emilia-Romagna region.  The conductor Claudio Abbado usually presents one opera every season and the 2007 schedule  shows four operas being staged between February and April, along with dance and theatre and other events of various kinds.

Between January and April 2008 the four operas performed were Motezuma by Vivaldi, Maria de Buenos Aires by Astor Piazolla, Tosca by Puccini and Lucia di Lammermoor by Donizetti. The theatre's 2013/14 season shows performances of four operas.

See also
List of opera houses

References
Notes

Sources
Lynn, Karyl Charna, Italian Opera Houses and Festivals, Lanham, Maryland: The Scarecrow Press, Inc., 2005. 
Plantamura, Carol, The Opera Lover's Guide to Europe, Citadel Press, 1996,

External links
 Teatro Comunale official website (in English), although most links lead to the Italian version

Opera houses in Italy
Buildings and structures in Ferrara
Performing arts venues in Emilia-Romagna
Theatres completed in 1798
 
Music venues completed in 1798
18th-century architecture in Italy